Kresnikus beynoni is an extinct, fossil species of hide beetle that lived in modern-day Northern Myanmar during the mid-Cretaceous. K. beynoni is the only species of both the genus Kresnikus and the subfamily Kresnikinae.

References

†
Fossil taxa described in 2020
Extinct beetles